"Girls / Girls / Boys" is a song by American rock band Panic! at the Disco. It was released as the third single from their fourth studio album, Too Weird to Live, Too Rare to Die!, on October 7, 2013. The music video for the song, directed by DJay Brawner, was also released on the day after. It peaked at number 31 on the Billboard Hot Rock Songs chart. It was the final single released with drummer Spencer Smith and bassist Dallon Weekes, as well as the last song released by Panic! at the Disco as a band, with further music being released as a solo project by Brendon Urie.

Writing and composition 
"Girls / Girls / Boys" was co-written by Brendon Urie and Dallon Weekes. The lyrics have been described as "racy", as the song depicts a love triangle complicated by the female love interest's attraction to women, described by Urie in an interview as being "barsexual" rather than bisexual. In a 2018 interview with Paper, Urie stated the song was a recollection of his first threesome experience.
 
The bass line of "Girls / Girls / Boys" is performed by Weekes, who was compared to Duran Duran bassist, John Taylor.

In an interview with Bass Player in December 2013, Weekes commented on the song's bass line.

Music video 
The music video for "Girls / Girls / Boys" was directed by DJay Brawner and released the day after the single. The video was compared to the music video of D'Angelo's, "Untitled (How Does It Feel)", which Urie cited as an inspiration to the video. The video uses the same black background as Untitled, and is also done in a single shot, pulling back to show a nude Urie, and stopping just before showing the pubic region; there has been a rumour that he was wearing very low pants. A director's cut of the music video was released on July 28, 2014. The version is identical to the original, except it includes two women kissing each other and heavily touching Urie near the end of the video.

Chart performance

Certifications

References

External links
 

2013 songs
Songs written by Brendon Urie
Songs written by Dallon Weekes
Panic! at the Disco songs
Fueled by Ramen singles
Bisexuality-related songs
LGBT-related songs